Ku80  is a protein that, in humans, is encoded by the XRCC5 gene.  Together, Ku70 and Ku80 make up the Ku heterodimer, which binds to DNA double-strand break ends and is required for the non-homologous end joining (NHEJ) pathway of DNA repair.  It is also required for V(D)J recombination, which utilizes the NHEJ pathway to promote antigen diversity in the mammalian immune system.

In addition to its role in NHEJ, Ku is required for telomere length maintenance and subtelomeric gene silencing.

Ku was originally identified when patients with systemic lupus erythematosus were found to have high levels of autoantibodies to the protein.

Nomenclature 

Ku80 has been referred to by several names including:
 Lupus Ku autoantigen protein p80
 ATP-dependent DNA helicase 2 subunit 2
 X-ray repair complementing defective repair in Chinese hamster cells 5
 X-ray repair cross-complementing 5 (XRCC5)

Epigenetic repression 

The protein expression level of Ku80 can be repressed by epigenetic hypermethylation of the promoter region of  gene XRCC5 which encodes Ku80.  In a study of 87 matched pairs of primary tumors of non-small-cell lung carcinoma and nearby normal lung tissue, 25% of the tumors had loss of heterozygosity at the XRCC5 locus and a similar percentage of  tumors had hypermethylation of the promoter region of XRCC5.  Low protein expression of Ku80 was significantly associated with low mRNA expression and with XRCC5 promoter hypermethylation but not with LOH of the gene.

Senescence 

Mouse mutants with homozygous defects in Ku80 experience an early onset of senescence.  Ku80(-/-) mice exhibit aging-related pathology (osteopenia, atrophic skin, hepatocellular degeneration, hepatocellular inclusions, hepatic hyperplastic foci and age-specific mortality). Furthermore, Ku80(-/-) mice exhibit severely reduced lifespan and size.  Loss of only a single Ku80 allele in Ku(-/+) heterozygous mice causes accelerated aging in skeletal muscle, although post natal growth is normal.  An analysis of the level of Ku80 protein in human, cow, and mouse indicated that Ku80 levels vary dramatically between species, and that these levels are strongly correlated with species longevity.  These results suggest that the NHEJ pathway of DNA repair mediated by Ku80 plays a significant role in repairing double-strand breaks that would otherwise cause early senescence (see DNA damage theory of aging).

Clinical significance 

A rare microsatellite polymorphism in this gene is associated with cancer in patients of varying radiosensitivity.

Deficiency in cancer 

A deficiency in expression of a DNA repair gene increases the risk for cancer (see Deficient DNA repair in carcinogenesis).  Ku80 protein expression was found to be deficient in melanoma.  In addition, low expression of Ku80 was found in 15% of adenocarcinoma type and  32% of squamous cell type non-small cell lung cancers, and this was correlated with hypermethylation of the XRCC5 promoter.

Ku80 appears to be one of 26 different DNA repair proteins that are epigenetically repressed in various cancers (see Cancer epigenetics).

Interactions 

Ku80 has been shown to interact with:

 DNA-PKcs, 
 GCN5L2, 
 Ku70, 
 NCOA6, 
 PCNA,
 POU2F1, 
 TERF2IP, 
 Telomerase reverse transcriptase, 
 Tyrosine kinase 2,  and
 Werner syndrome ATP-dependent helicase.

References

Further reading

External links 
 PDBe-KB provides an overview of all the structure information available in the PDB for Human X-ray repair cross-complementing protein 5